Berkshire Bank is a bank headquartered in Boston, Massachusetts. It is a subsidiary of Berkshire Hills Bancorp, a bank holding company. The bank operates 130 branches in New England, New York and the Mid-Atlantic, and is the largest regional bank headquartered in Massachusetts.

History
The bank was founded on February 6, 1846 as Berkshire County Savings Bank.

In 1997, the bank acquired Great Barrington Savings Bank and changed its name to Berkshire Bank. In 1998, James A. Cunningham Jr. was named president and chief executive officer of the bank.

The bank acquired Woronoco Savings Bank in 2005, Factory Point National Bank in 2007, Rome Savings Bank in April 2011, Legacy Banks in July 2011, Connecticut Bank & Trust Company in April 2012, Beacon Federal Bank in October 2012, Hampden Bank in April 2015, First Choice Bank in December 2016, Commerce Bank & Trust Company in October 2017, and SI Financial Group in 2019.

In November 2017, the bank signed a lease for a new headquarters at 60 State Street in Government Center, Boston.

Michael Day announced his resignation as President and CEO of Berkshire Hills Bancorp on November 26, 2018. Richard Marotta became President and CEO thereafter.

Richard Marotta resigned as CEO of Berkshire Hills Bancorp on August 10, 2020. President Sean Gray was named Acting Chief Executive Officer of the Company.

On January 25, 2021, the Board of Directors announced that Nitin J. Mhatre was appointed CEO, effective January 29, 2021. It was also announced that Sean Gray, who had been serving as Acting CEO, will continue to serve as President and Chief Operating Officer of the Bank.

References

External links
 

Companies based in Boston
Banks based in Massachusetts
Banks established in 1846
1846 establishments in Massachusetts
Companies listed on the New York Stock Exchange